Sharer is the surname of:

 Kevin W. Sharer (born 1948), American businessman
 Robert Sharer (1940–2012), American archaeologist, academic and Mayanist researcher
 Shanda Sharer (1979–1992), American murder victim
 Stephen Sharer  (born 1998), American YouTube vlogger
 William Sharer (born 1959), American politician

See also
 Shearer, another surname
 Sheerer, another surname